The Dutch football champions are the winners of the highest league in Dutch football, which since 1956 is the Eredivisie.

The championship was first awarded in 1898. Until 1954 the national champion was determined by means of a championship competition between the champions of the different regions. This system continued for two years after the introduction of professional football in 1954 until the creation of the Eredivisie for the 1956–57 season. Starting with the 1956–57 season, the winner of the Eredivisie is recognized as the national champion.

List of champions

National Champions (1888–1956)

Eredivisie (1956–)

Titles 
Information on clubs with the most titles won is provided in the following table, listing both overall title wins, and those since the introduction of professional football in 1954/55:

Most titles
A list of clubs by most titles won is shown in the following table:

* As Rapid JC.

See also 
 Eredivisie
 KNVB Cup
 Johan Cruyff Shield
 Big Three (Netherlands)

References

External links 
 Netherlands - Champions, RSSSF.com

Football champions
National association football champions